Amen! is the second album by singer and actress Della Reese. The album was her second record for Jubilee Records, and her first of many records dedicated solely to sacred and spiritual material. The album features background vocals by the Meditation Singers, which she had been a part of in the early ’50s. The album also features vocals by the then unknown singer Laura Lee, who had incidentally replaced Reese in the group, when she left in 1953.

The album was released on Compact Disc, alongside her 1959 album What Do You Know About Love?, for the first time in 2008, by Collector’s Choice.

Track listing
 “Amen!” (Adapted by Palitz) – 3:56
 “Jesus Will Answer Your Prayer” (Barret, Lillenas) – 2:46
 “Last Mile of the Way” (Adapted by Palitz) – 4:06
 “Nobody Knows the Trouble I've Seen” (Adapted by Palitz) – 4:41
 “Rock-a-My Soul” (Adapted by Palitz) – 2:04
 “Hard to Get Along” (Rundles) – 5:20
 “Up Above My Head I Hear Music in the Air” (Tharpe) – 3:08
 “I Know the Lord Has Laid His Hands on Me” (Adapted by Palitz) – 3:39
 “Jesus” (Coleman) 2:21

References

1958 albums
Della Reese albums
Jubilee Records albums